Edward Leslie Mayo (July 26, 1904 in Dorchester, Massachusetts – December 4, 1979 in Grinnell, Iowa) was an American poet, English professor, and author.

Life
Mayo attended schools in Malden, Massachusetts, and then studied at Bates College in Lewiston, Maine. He worked as a brush salesman, a music store clerk, a waiter at the Mount Washington Hotel, and a wine steward in the Bahamas.

In 1929 Mayo returned to study at the University of Minnesota. He graduated with a B.A. magna cum laude in 1932, and a M.A. in 1936.

Career 
Over the course of his career, Mayo taught English at the Phillips Academy in Andover, Massachusetts, Drake University in Des Moines, Iowa, and at both the University of Minnesota and Macalester College in St. Paul, Minnesota. In 1953, he was awarded the first Amy Lowell Poetry Traveling Scholarship which, along with a Drake donor matching gift, allowed him to spend 1953 through 1954 teaching and working in England and traveling in Europe. Mayo was also a professor of English at Iowa Wesleyan College, and in 1961 received an honorary degree.  Mayo taught Roger Weaver (poet) at the University of Oregon. The American poet and essayist Ben Howard was also Mayo's student at Drake University from 1962 to 1964 and from 1965 to 1966.

Mayo's work appeared in Poetry  and Poetry Magazine.

Personal life 
He met his wife, Myra Margaret Buchanan Morton, after she won a prize in a poetry competition and he received honorable mention.  They married on September 10, 1936, at the House of Hope Presbyterian Church in St. Paul, Minnesota.

Mayo died in 1979 from congestive heart failure. He was survived by his wife, Myra, and children Mary Elizabeth, Alice Myra Breemer, John Harvey, and their grandchildren.

Awards
 Payne Prize (1932)
 The Oscar Blumenthal Prize (Poetry, Chicago, 1942)
 Amy Lowell Poetry Travelling Scholarship (1953–54)
 1982 American Book Award

Works

Poetry Books

Criticism

References

External links
 "E. L. Mayo", Ohio University Press • Swallow Press

1904 births
1979 deaths
Bates College alumni
University of Minnesota alumni
Drake University faculty
Educators from Iowa
20th-century American poets
American Book Award winners